Botswana has competed in 11 Summer Olympics. Botswana's debut was at the 1980 Summer Olympics, in Moscow. They have yet to compete in a Winter Olympics. Botswana won its inaugural medal at the 2012 Summer Olympics with Nijel Amos
getting a silver in the 800m. The men's 4 x 400 relay team won a bronze medal at the Tokyo Olympics.

Medal tables

Medals by Summer Olympics

Medals by sport

List of medalists

See also
 List of flag bearers for Botswana at the Olympics
 Botswana at the Paralympics

External links